The 2019 Glastonbury Festival of Contemporary Performing Arts took place between 26 and 30 June. The three headlining acts were Stormzy, the Killers and The Cure. This was the last regular edition until 2022 when the subsequent two editions were cancelled due to the COVID-19 pandemic, known as enforced "fallow" years.

Kylie Minogue's much anticipated performance in the Legends time slot became the most viewed Glastonbury performance in the festival’s history with 3.9 million viewers, marking the Australian's return to the festival after being forced to pull out in 2005 after being diagnosed with breast cancer.

New areas

New areas developed for the 2019 festival included "Glastonbury-on-Sea" which included a metal seaside with amusements and animatronics. Block9 in the South East corner of the site was expanded with the inclusion of a new venue and installation, IICON, described as "a pseudo-religious monument to the terrifying new realities emerging in our digital, data-driven, post-truth age".

2019 FIFA Women's World Cup Screening 
Glastonbury Festival confirmed via their Twitter account that they would show the 2019 FIFA Women's World Cup quarter-final match between England and Norway on big screens at the West Holt's Stage, after a request from England Women's player Georgia Stanway whose brother would be at the festival and would have no other way of watching the match. Kick-off was at 8 pm BST on 27 June and England won the game 3–0.

Tickets
General Admission Tickets for the festival cost £248 for the full weekend and sold out.

Weather
The weather was consistently dry and warm throughout the weekend, with temperatures rising throughout the week and peaking on the Saturday afternoon, before cooler conditions made their way in for Sunday. The festival was totally rain free for the first time since 2010 and also experienced the highest average temperatures for almost a decade.

Line-up
The line-up was:

Pyramid Stage

A. Bastille's set featured appearances by Rationale and Lewis Capaldi.
B. Stormzy's set featured appearances by Chris Martin, Dave and Fredo. 
C. The Killers' set featured appearances by Pet Shop Boys and Johnny Marr. 
D. Kylie Minogue's set featured appearances by Nick Cave and Chris Martin. 
E. Miley Cyrus' set featured appearances by Mark Ronson, Billy Ray Cyrus and Lil Nas X.

Other Stage

West Holts Stage

John Peel Stage

Park Stage

Bimble Inn

WOW

References

External links

2019 in British music
2019 in England
2010s in Somerset
2019
June 2019 events in the United Kingdom